Hopkins Park is a village in Kankakee County, Illinois, United States. The population was 603 at the 2010 census, down from 711 at the 2000 census. It is part of the Kankakee–Bradley Metropolitan Statistical Area.

Geography
Hopkins Park is located in southeastern Kankakee County at  (41.072450, -87.605109).

Hopkins Park is located on the Pembroke Savannah.

The Pembroke Savannah Nature Preserve is nearby.

Demographics

As of the census of 2000, there were 711 people, 241 households, and 161 families residing in the village. The racial makeup of the village was 4.08% White, 92.26% African American, 0.14% Asian, 1.97% from other races, and 1.55% from two or more races. Hispanic or Latino of any race were 2.11% of the population.

There were 241 households, out of which 31.1% had children under the age of 18 living with them, 27.0% were married couples living together, 30.7% had a female householder with no husband present, and 32.8% were non-families. 26.6% of all households were made up of individuals, and 10.8% had someone living alone who was 65 years of age or older. The average household size was 2.95 and the average family size was 3.60.

In the village, the population was spread out, with 37.8% under the age of 18, 9.3% from 18 to 24, 22.8% from 25 to 44, 18.6% from 45 to 64, and 11.5% who were 65 years of age or older. The median age was 29 years. For every 100 females, there were 87.6 males. For every 100 females age 18 and over, there were 81.9 males.

The Median House Value was $62,300.

The median income for a household in the village was $17,778, and the median income for a family was $19,792. Males had a median income of $33,125 versus $25,250 for females. The per capita income for the village was $8,788. About 35.4% of families and 44.2% of the population were below the poverty line, including 61.6% of those under age 18 and 30.1% of those age 65 or over.

References

External links
Official website

Villages in Kankakee County, Illinois
Villages in Illinois